Cyanthillium wollastonii  is a species of plant in the family Asteraceae. It is native to East Africa.
It is a delicate shrub that can grow up to 3 meters tall while stems are 5m tall.

References 

Flora of Ethiopia
Flora of Kenya
Flora of Malawi
Flora of Mozambique
Flora of South Africa
Flora of Sudan
Flora of Swaziland
Flora of Tanzania
Flora of Uganda
Flora of Zambia
Flora of Zimbabwe
wollastonii